African philosophy is the philosophical discourse produced in Africa or by indigenous Africans. The term Africana philosophy covers the philosophy made by African descendants, including African Americans. African philosophers are found in the various academic fields of present philosophy, such as metaphysics, epistemology, moral philosophy, and political philosophy. One particular subject that several modern African philosophers have written about is that on the subject of freedom and what it means to be free or to experience wholeness. Philosophy in Africa has a rich and varied history, some of which has been lost over time. Some of the world's oldest philosophical texts have been produced in Ancient Egypt (Kemet), written in Hieratic and on papyrus, from ca. 2200 to 1000 BCE, one of the earliest known African philosophers was Ptahhotep, an ancient Egyptian philosopher. In general, the ancient Greeks acknowledged the Egyptian forebearers, and in the fifth century BCE, the philosopher Isocrates declared that earliest Greek thinkers traveled to Egypt to seek knowledge; one of them Pythagoras of Samos who “was first to bring to the Greeks all philosophy.” In the 21st century, new research by Egyptologists has indicated that the word "philosopher" itself seems to stem from Egypt: "the founding Greek word philosophos, lover of wisdom, is itself a borrowing from and translation of the Egyptian concept mer-rekh (mr-rḫ) which literally means “lover of wisdom,” or knowledge." In the early and mid-twentieth century, anti-colonial movements had a tremendous effect on the development of a distinct modern African political philosophy that had resonance on both the continent and in the African diaspora. One well-known example of the economic philosophical works emerging from this period was the African socialist philosophy of Ujamaa propounded in Tanzania and other parts of Southeast Africa. These African political and economic philosophical developments also had a notable impact on the anti-colonial movements of many non-African peoples around the world.

Definition
There is some debate in defining the ethnophilosophical parameters of African philosophy and identifying what differentiates it from other philosophical traditions. One of the implicit assumptions of ethnophilosophy is that a specific culture can have a philosophy that is not applicable and accessible to all peoples and cultures in the world. In A Discourse on African Philosophy: A New Perspective on Ubuntu and Transitional Justice in South Africa, Christian B. N. Gade argues that the ethnophilosophical approach to African philosophy as a static group property is highly problematic. His research on ubuntu presents an alternative collective discourse on African philosophy that takes differences, historical developments, and social contexts seriously. According to Edwin Etieyibo and Jonathon O. Chimakonam in their article “African Philosophy: Past, Present, and Future”, historical context plays an important role in African philosophy. History provides the framework in which we can inspect philosophical problems. In terms of African philosophy, one must look at the whole picture through the lens of African history.  “There are no facts without history."

African philosophy can be formally defined as a critical thinking by Africans on their experiences of reality. Nigerian born Philosopher K.C. Anyanwu defined African philosophy as "that which concerns itself with the way in which African people of the past and present make sense of their destiny and of the world in which they live.

Nigerian philosopher Joseph I. Omoregbe broadly defines a philosopher as one who attempts to understand the world's phenomena, the purpose of human existence, the nature of the world, and the place of human beings in that world. This form of natural philosophy is identifiable in Africa even before individual African philosophers can be distinguished in the sources. Like Western philosophy, African philosophy contemplates the perceptions of time, personhood, space and other subjects.

History 
There is a rich, and written, history of ancient African philosophy - for example from ancient Egypt, Ethiopia, and Mali (Timbuktutu, Djenne). When it comes to the modern era and the 20th century, a new beginning is linked to the 1920s, when African individuals who had studied in the United States and Europe ("Western" locations) returned to Africa and reflected on the racial discrimination experienced abroad. Their arrival back in Africa instigated a feeling of onuma, which is an interpretation of "frustration." The onuma was felt in response to legacies of colonialism on a global scale. The renaissance of African philosophy in the 20th century is important because onuma inspired some who had traveled and returned to formulate a "systematic beginning" of philosophizing the African identity, the space of African people in history, and African contribution to humanity.

Criteria 
According to some, two conflicting components are deemed integral to a work for it to be considered African philosophy. First, the piece must have a racial focus. This facet is valued by Traditionalist groups, who posit that African philosophy should be an expression of the world experienced by African individuals. African philosophy must be produced by African authors. In contrast, Universalist groups suggest that African philosophy should be analyses and critical engagement of and between individual African thinkers. A work is African philosophy based on a focal point of tradition. African philosophy must pull from African cultural backgrounds or thought processes, but it should be independent from racial considerations and use "African" only as a term of solidarity.

Methods

Communitarian method 
The communitarian method of African philosophy emphasizes mutualism in thought. It is most commonly used by researchers following ubuntu. The common expression of ubuntu is that "a person is a person through a person." Leonhard Praeg, Mogobe Ramose, and Fainos Mangera implement the communitarian method.

Complementary method 
The complementary method focuses on the prospect of a missing link. All variables are important in consideration of histories and identities, and no variable should be overlooked or under-considered. Additionally, all variables affect one another, so the relationship between them and their affects on other variables should be scrutinized. Mesembe Edet implements the complementary method.

Conversational method 
The conversational method creates thought by assessing a relationship between oppositional works. The defender or proponent is named "nwa-swa," and the nwa swa is questioned and doubted by a disagreeing party, known as "nwa nju." The conversational method emphasizes the interconnectedness of networks within reality; the more accurate a thought should be, the more specific a location should be. This method is endorsed by the Conventional School of Psychology, and it is used by Victor Nweke and Msembe Edet.

Types

Pre-modern

North Africa
In North Africa, arguably central to the development of the ancient Egyptian philosophical tradition of Egypt and Sudan was the conception of "ma'at", which roughly translated refers to "justice", "truth", or simply "that which is right". One of the earliest works of political philosophy was The Maxims of Ptahhotep, which were taught to Egyptian schoolboys for centuries.

Ancient Egypt have several philosophical texts that have been treated by scholars in recent years. In the 2018 podcast "Africana Philosophy", the philosophers Peter Adamson and Chike Jeffers devoted the first eight episodes to Egyptian philosophy. The American Philosophical Association (APA) has published a text on the classical text "The Immortality of Writers" ("Be A Writer"), ca. 1200 BCE. The Blog of the APA article also covers “The Dispute Between a Man and His Ba” of 19th century BCE; “The Teaching of Ani”, 13th century BCE, which gives advice to the ordinary man; “The Satire of the Trades” by Khety; and the text of Amennakht (active in 1170–1140 BCE) from Deir El-Medina, whose teaching states that “it is good to finish school, better than the smell of lotus blossoms in summer.”

Ancient Egyptian philosophers also made important contributions to Hellenistic philosophy and Christian philosophy. According to Busiris by the ancient Greek philosopher Isocrates, the senior of Plato, “all men agree the Egyptians are the healthiest and most long of life among men; and then for the soul they introduced philosophy’s training…” In the Hellenistic tradition, the influential philosophical school of Neoplatonism was founded by the Egyptian philosopher Plotinus in the third century CE. The Church Father and philosopher Augustin of Hippo (born in Thagaste, today's Algeria, in 354) had a Christian mother, Saint Monnika, who was an Amazigh (Berber), and Augustin defined himself as an African (or Punic, of Phoenician descent).

West Africa
The most prominent of West Africa's pre-modern philosophical traditions has been identified as that of the Yoruba philosophical tradition and the distinctive worldview that emerged from it over the thousands of years of its development. Philosophical concepts such as Ifá, Omoluabi, Ashè and Emi Omo Eso were integral to this system, and the totality of its elements are contained in what is known amongst the Yoruba as the Itan. The cosmologies and philosophies of the Akan, Dogon, Serer and Dahomey were also significant.

In pre-colonial Senegambia (modern Gambia and Senegal), the 17th-century philosopher Kocc Barma Fall (b. 1586) stood out as one of the renowned philosophers in Senegambian history. His proverbs are still recited by Senegalese and Gambians alike, including in Senegambian popular culture - for example in Ousmane Sembene's films such as Guelwaar Other notable philosophical thinkers include the Gambian historian Alieu Ebrima Cham Joof, and the Malian ethnologist Amadou Hampâté Bâ.

One of the foremost scholars of Timbuktu was Ahmed Baba (1556–1627), who argued against what he called "racial slavery". One of the leading women philosophers and writers of the Sokoto Caliphate, in present-day Nigeria, was the princess Nana Asma'u (1793-1864).

Horn of Africa
In the Horn of Africa, there are a number of sources documenting the development of a distinct Ethiopian philosophy from the first millennium onwards. Among the most notable examples from this tradition emerge from the work of the 17th-century philosopher Zera Yacob, and that of his disciple Walda Heywat. Yacob in his writings discusses religion, morality, and existence. He comes to the belief that every person will believe their faith to be the right one and that all men are created equal.

Southern Africa
In Southern Africa and Southeast Africa the development of a distinctive Bantu philosophy addressing the nature of existence, the cosmos and humankind's relation to the world following the Bantu migration has had the most significant impact on the philosophical developments of the said regions, with the development of the philosophy of Ubuntu as one notable example emerging from this worldview.

Central Africa
Many Central African philosophical traditions before the Bantu migration into southern Central Africa have been identified as a uniting characteristic of many Nilotic and Sudanic peoples, ultimately giving rise to the distinctive worldviews identified in the conceptions of time, the creation of the world, human nature, and the proper relationship between mankind and nature prevalent in Dinka mythology, Maasai mythology and similar traditions.

African Diaspora
Some pre-Modern African diasporic philosophical traditions have also been identified, mostly produced by descendants of Africans in Europe and the Americas. One notable pre-modern diasporic African philosopher was Anthony William Amo, who was taken as a slave from Awukenu in what is now Ghana, and was brought up and educated in Europe where he gained doctorates in medicine and philosophy, and subsequently became a professor of philosophy at the universities of Halle and Jena in Germany.

Modern
Kenyan philosopher Henry Odera Oruka has distinguished what he calls four trends in modern African philosophy: ethnophilosophy, philosophical sagacity, nationalistic–ideological philosophy, and professional philosophy. In fact it would be more realistic to call them candidates for the position of African philosophy, with the understanding that more than one of them might fit the bill. (Oruka later added two additional categories: literary/artistic philosophy, such as the work of literary figures such as Ngũgĩ wa Thiong'o, Wole Soyinka, Chinua Achebe, Okot p'Bitek, and Taban Lo Liyong, and hermeneutic philosophy, the analysis of African languages in order to find philosophical content.) In the African diaspora, American philosopher Maulana Karenga has also been notable in presenting varied definitions for understanding modern African philosophy, especially as it relates to its earliest sources.

One notable contributor to professional philosophy is Achille Mbembe. He interacts with a multitude of modern subjects, including thoughts on statehood, death, capital, racism, and colonialism. His invokes attention to moral and political arguments through a tone of morality in his works. Many recent pieces from Mbembe, including Critique of Black Reason, suggest that understanding Europe as a force not at the center of the universe is a point from which philosophy and society should view the world. Mbembe asserts that he positions himself in multiple worlds of existence at one time. This method creates an empathetic point from which the world can be viewed.

Ethnophilosophy and philosophical sagacity
Henry Odera Oruka of Kenya came up with Sage Philosophy and philosophic sagacity is attributed to him. Ethnophilosophy has been used to record the beliefs found in African cultures. Such an approach treats African philosophy as consisting in a set of shared beliefs, values, categories, and assumptions that are implicit in the language, practices, and beliefs of African cultures; in short, the uniquely African worldview. As such, it is seen as an item of communal property rather than an activity for the individual.

One proponent of this form, Placide Tempels, argued in Bantu Philosophy that the metaphysical categories of the Bantu people are reflected in their linguistic categories. According to this view, African philosophy can be best understood as springing from the fundamental assumptions about reality reflected in the languages of Africa.

Another example of this sort of approach is the work of Ebiegberi Joe Alagoa of the University of Port Harcourt in Nigeria, who argues for the existence of an African philosophy of history stemming from traditional proverbs from the Niger Delta in his paper "An African Philosophy of History in the Oral Tradition." Alagoa argues that in African philosophy, age is seen as an important factor in gaining wisdom and interpreting the past. In support of this view, he cites proverbs such as "More days, more wisdom", and "What an old man sees seated, a youth does not see standing." Truth is seen as eternal and unchanging ("Truth never rots"), but people are subject to error ("Even a four-legged horse stumbles and falls"). It is dangerous to judge by appearances ("A large eye does not mean keen vision"), but first-hand observation can be trusted ("He who sees does not err"). The past is not seen as fundamentally different from the present, but all history is contemporary history ("A storyteller does not tell of a different season"). The future remains beyond knowledge ("Even a bird with a long neck cannot see the future"). Nevertheless, it is said, "God will outlive eternity." History is seen as vitally important ("One ignorant of his origin is nonhuman"), and historians (known as "sons of the soil") are highly revered ("The son of the soil has the python's keen eyes"). However, these arguments must be taken with a grain of cultural relativism, as the span of culture in Africa is incredibly vast, with patriarchies, matriarchies, monotheists and traditional religionists among the population, and as such the attitudes of groups of the Niger Delta cannot be applied to the whole of Africa.

Another more controversial application of this approach is embodied in the concept of Negritude. Leopold Senghor, a proponent of Negritude, argued that the distinctly African approach to reality is based on emotion rather than logic, works itself out in participation rather than analysis, and manifests itself through the arts rather than the sciences. Cheikh Anta Diop and Mubabinge Bilolo, on the other hand, while agreeing that African culture is unique, challenged the view of Africans as essentially emotional and artistic, arguing that Egypt was an African culture whose achievements in science, mathematics, architecture, and philosophy were pre-eminent. This philosophy may also be maligned as overly reductionist due to the obvious scientific and scholarly triumphs of not only ancient Egypt, but also Nubia, Meroe, as well as the great library of Timbuktu, the extensive trade networks and kingdoms of North Africa, West Africa, Central Africa, the Horn of Africa and Great Zimbabwe and the other major empires of Southern, Southeast and Central Africa.

Critics of this approach argue that the actual philosophical work in producing a coherent philosophical position is being done by the academic philosopher (such as Alagoa), and that the sayings of the same culture can be selected from and organised in many different ways in order to produce very different, often contradictory systems of thought.

Philosophical sagacity is a sort of individualist version of ethnophilosophy, in which one records the beliefs of certain special members of a community. The premise here is that, although most societies demand some degree of conformity of belief and behaviour from their members, a certain few of those members reach a particularly high level of knowledge and understanding of their cultures' worldviews; such people are sages. In some cases, the sage goes beyond mere knowledge and understanding to reflection and questioning—these become the targets of philosophical sagacity.

Critics of this approach note that not all reflection and questioning is philosophical; besides, if African philosophy were to be defined purely in terms of philosophic sagacity, then the thoughts of the sages could not be African philosophy, for they did not record them from other sages. Also, on this view the only difference between non-African anthropology or ethnology and African philosophy seems to be the nationality of the researcher.

Critics argue further that the problem with both ethnophilosophy and philosophical sagacity is that there is surely an important distinction between philosophy and the history of ideas, although other philosophers consider the two topics to be remarkably similar. The argument is that no matter how interesting the beliefs of a people such as the Akan or the Yoruba may be to the philosopher, they remain beliefs, not philosophy. To call them philosophy is to use a secondary sense of that term, such as in "my philosophy is live and let live.

Professional philosophy
Professional philosophy is usually identified as that produced by African philosophers trained in the Western philosophical tradition, that embraces a universal view of the methods and concerns of philosophy. Those philosophers identified in this category often explicitly reject the assumptions of ethnophilosophy and adopt a universalist worldview of philosophy that requires all philosophy to be accessible and applicable to all peoples and cultures in the world This is even if the specific philosophical questions prioritized by individual national or regional philosophies may differ. Some African philosophers classified in this category are Odera Oruka,Paulin Hountondji, Peter Bodunrin, Kwasi Wiredu, Tsenay Serequeberhan, Marcien Towa and Lansana Keita.

Nationalist and ideological philosophy

Nationalist and ideological philosophy might be considered a special case of philosophic sagacity, in which not sages but ideologues are the subjects. Alternatively, it has been considered as a subcategory of professional political philosophy. In either case, the same sort of problem arises with retaining a distinction between ideology and philosophy, and also between sets of ideas and a special way of reasoning. Examples include African socialism, Nkrumaism, Harambee and Authenticité.

African ethics
Although Africa is extremely diverse, there appear to be some shared moral ideas across many ethnic groups. In a number of African cultures, ethics is centered on a person's character, and saying "he has no morals" translates as something like "he has no character". A person's character reflects the accumulation of their deeds and their habits of conduct; hence, it can be changed over a person's life. In some African cultures, "personhood" refers to an adult human who exhibits moral virtues, and one who behaves badly is not considered a person, even if he is considered a human.

While many traditional African societies are highly religious, their religions are not revealed, and hence, ethics does not center around divine commands. Instead, ethics is humanistic and utilitarian: it focuses on improving social functioning and human flourishing. On the other hand, social welfare is not a mere aggregate of individual welfare; rather, there is a collective "social good" embodying values that everyone wants, like peace and stability. In general, African ethics is social or collectivistic rather than individualistic and united in ideology. Cooperation and altruism are considered crucial. African ethics places more weight on duties of prosocial behaviour than on rights per se, in contrast to most of Western ethics.

Africana philosophy

Africana philosophy is the work of philosophers of African descent and others whose work deals with the subject matter of the African diaspora. This is a relatively new (since the 1980s) and developing name given to African thought, and it is given credible attention by professional organizations, including the American Philosophical Association.

Africana philosophy includes the philosophical ideas, arguments and theories of particular concern to people of African descent. Some of the topics explored by Africana philosophy include: pre-Socratic African philosophy and modern day debates discussing the early history of Western philosophy, post-colonial writing in Africa and the Americas, black resistance to oppression, black existentialism in the United States, and the meaning of "blackness" in the modern world.

List of African philosophers
This is a list of notable philosophers who theorize in the African tradition, as well as philosophers from the continent of Africa.

Algerian
 Albert Camus
 Louis Althusser
 Mohammed Arkoun
 Augustine of Hippo
 Malek Bennabi
 Hélène Cixous
 Jacques Derrida
 Frantz Fanon
 Bernard-Henri Lévy
 Mohammed Chaouki Zine

Beninese
 Paulin J. Hountondji

Cameroonian
 Achille Mbembe

Congolese
 Jacques Depelchin
 V. Y. Mudimbe
 Ernest Wamba dia Wamba
 Theophile Obenga

Egyptian
 Ptah-Hotep
 Kagemni I
 Mustafa Abd al-Rizq
 Arnouphis
 Abdel Rahman Badawi
 Mohamed Osman Elkhosht
 George of Laodicea
 Hassan Hanafi
 Ihab Hassan
 Zaki Naguib Mahmoud
 Abdel Wahab El-Messiri
 Plotinus
 Rifa'a al-Tahtawi
 Fouad Zakariyya
 Maimonides

Ethiopian
 Walda Heywat
 Zera Yacob

Gambian
 Kocc Barma Fall
 Alieu Ebrima Cham Joof

Ghanaian
 Kwame Nkrumah
 Nii Bortey Bilson
 Kwame Anthony Appiah
 Al-Hajj Salim Suwari
 Anton Wilhelm Amo
 W. E. B. Du Bois
 Kwame Gyekye
 Ato Sekyi-Otu
 Kwasi Wiredu

Hellenistic
 Apollodorus of Athens
 Clitimachus
 Dio of Alexandria
 Dionysius of Cyrene
 Heraclides Lembus
 Hypatia
 Lacydes of Cyrene

Kenyan
 John Mbiti
 Micere Githae Mugo
 Henry Odera Oruka
 Ngũgĩ wa Thiong'o
 PLO Lumumba

Libyan
 Sextus Julius Africanus
 Aref Ali Nayed

Malawian
 Didier Kaphagawani

Malian
 Amadou Hampâté Bâ

Moroccan
 Taha Abdurrahman
 Alain Badiou
 Bensalem Himmich
 Mohammed Abed al-Jabri
 Mohammed Aziz Lahbabi
 Judah ben Nissim
 Mohammed Sabila
 Abu al-Abbas as-Sabti
 Mohammed Allal Sinaceur
 Hourya Sinaceur
 Abdellatif Zeroual

Mozambican
 Severino Ngoenha
 José P. Castiano

Nigerian
 Obafemi Awolowo
 John Olubi Sodipo
 Chinua Achebe
 Wole Soyinka
 Nana Asma'u
 Emmanuel Chukwudi Eze
 Joseph I. Omoregbe
 Usman dan Fodio
 Josephat Obi Oguejiofor
 Ike Odimegwu
 Theophilus Okere
Sophie Oluwole
 Olusegun Teju Oladipo
 Kolawole Olu-Owolabi
Kevin Ugochukwu Onwunali
Rwandan
 Alexis Kagame

Senegalese
 Cheikh Anta Diop
 Leopold Sedar Senghor
 Souleymane Bachir Diagne
 Kocc Barma Fall

South African
 Es'kia Mphahlele
 John Langalibalele Dube
 Steve Biko
 Gift Gugu Mona
 Mabogo P. More
 Mogobe Ramose
 Mpho Tshivhase
 David Benatar

Tanzanian
 Julius Nyerere

Tunisian
 Rachida Triki

See also
 African philosophers
Ancient Egyptian philosophy

References

Further reading
 Amo, Antin Wilhelm Amo: Anton Wilhelm Amo's Philosophical Dissertations on Mind and Body (Edited and translated by Stephen Menn and Justin E. H. Smith) (2000: Oxford University Press)
K.C. Anyanwu (and E.A. Ruch), African Philosophy: An Introduction, Catholic Book Agency 1981
 Mubabinge Bilolo, Contribution à l'histoire de la reconnaissance de Philosophie en Afrique Noire Traditionnelle, (1978: Kinshasa, Facultés Catholiques de Kinshasa, Licence en Philosophie et Religions Africaines)
 Mubabinge Bilolo, Les cosmo-théologies philosophiques de l'Égypte Antique. Problématiques, Prémisses herméneutiques et problèmes majeurs. Academy of African Thought, Sect. I, vol. 1, (1986: Kinshasa-Munich-Libreville, African University Studies)
 Peter O. Bodunrin, Philosophy in Africa: Trends and Perspectives (1985: University of Ife Press)
 Babajide Dasaolu/Demilade Oyelakun, The concept of evil in Yoruba and Igbo thoughts: Some Comparisons in: Philosophia: E-Journal of Philosophy and Culture – 10/2015.
Emmanuel Chukwudi Eze (Ed.): African Philosophy. An Anthology (1998: Blackwell Publishers)
 Christian B. N. Gade, A Discourse on African Philosophy: A New Perspective on Ubuntu and Transitional Justice in South Africa (2017: Lexington Books)
 Dag Herbjørnsrud, The African Enlightenment. Aeon, December 2017.
 Dag Herbjørnsrud, The Radical Philosophy of Egypt: Forget God and Family, Write! Blog of the American Philosophical Association, December 2018. 
 Paulin J. Hountondji, African Philosophy: Myth and Reality (1983: Bloomington, Indiana University Press)
 Samuel Oluoch Imbo, An Introduction to African Philosophy (1998: Rowman & Littlefield) 
 Janheinz Jahn, Muntu: African culture and the Western world (1990: Grove Weidenfeld) 
 Bruce B. Janz,  African Philosophy (PDF)
 Alexis Kagame, La philosophie bantu-rwandaise de l'être (1966 Johnson Reprint)
 Gyekye Kwame, An Essay of African Philosophical Thought: The Akan Conceptual Scheme (1995: Temple University Press) 
 Safro Kwame, Reading in African Philosophy: An Akan Collection (1995: University Press of America) 
 T. Uzodinma Nwala,  Igbo Philosophy, 
 Joseph I. Omoregbe, African philosophy: yesterday and today (in Bodunrin; references to reprint in [E. C. Eze] [ed.] African Philosophy: An Anthology (1998: Oxford, Blackwell))
 H. Odera Oruka (ed.), Sage Philosophy [Volume 4 in Philosophy of History and Culture] (1990: E.J. Brill) , ISSN 0922-6001
 Tsenay Serequeberhan (ed.), African Philosophy: The Essential Readings (1991: Paragon House) 
 Placide Tempels, La philosophie bantoue (Bantu Philosophy), Elisabethville, 1945, Full text in French here.
 Kwasi Wiredu, Philosophy and an African (1980: Cambridge University Press)
 Kwasi Wiredu (ed.), A Companion to African Philosophy (2004: Blackwell)
 Kwasi Wiredu Toward Decolonizing African Philosophy And Religion In: African Studies Quarterly, The Online Journal for African Studies, Volume 1, Issue 4, 1998
 Olabiyi Babalola Yai, (Guest Editor),  African Studies Quarterly, Volume 1, Issue 4 (1998): Religion and Philosophy in Africa

External links
 Jonathan O. Chimakonam, History of African Philosophy in the Internet Encyclopedia of Philosophy
 Gail M. Presbey, African Sage Philosophy in the Internet Encyclopedia of Philosophy
 
 Igwebuikepedia: Internet Encyclopedia of African Philosophy
 African Philosophy —  African Studies Centre
 Africana Philosophy series of the History of Philosophy without any gaps podcast

 
African culture
African philosophers